Dmitri Viktorovich Meleshko (born November 8, 1982) is a Belarusian former professional ice hockey winger who most notably played for HC Dinamo Minsk of the Kontinental Hockey League (KHL).

Career statistics

Regular season and playoffs

International

References

External links

1982 births
Living people
Belarusian ice hockey right wingers
Expatriate ice hockey players in Russia
HC Dinamo Minsk players
HC Sibir Novosibirsk players
HC Spartak Moscow players
Ice hockey people from Minsk
Salavat Yulaev Ufa players
Olympic ice hockey players of Belarus
Ice hockey players at the 2010 Winter Olympics
Yunost Minsk players